Saint Théobald (990 in La Bazeuge – 1070 in Dorat) was a canon regular and French saint. Attracted by the reputation of Saint Israël, his parents sent him to the chapter at Dorat to study. He completed his studies at Périgueux, staying there several years. On his return, he was admitted to the Chapter. However, out of humility, he refused to be ordained and remained a deacon. As treasurer and sacristan, he was in charge of the administration of the collegial church of Saint-Pierre in Dorat, part of which was already in use, the other still being under construction. Following the example of Israël, he favoured the sick and poor. He died at Dorat on 16 November 1070, which is his day. He is buried in the crypt there with Saint Israël.

Further reading
 Guillaume Lavaud, Le dossier hagiographique des saints Israël et Théobald du Dorat, "Saint Israël, chanoine de l’An Mil - Etablissements canoniaux, pouvoir épiscopal et seigneuries laïques au temps des premiers Capétiens, Limousin et royaume de France", international colloquium organised by Université de Limoges and the CRIHAM, November 2014, Limoges-Le Dorat, France. Éd. Lavaud, 2020.

Medieval French saints
French Roman Catholic saints
990 births
1070 deaths